The Theodore Jansen House is a historic building located in the West End of Davenport, Iowa, United States. At the time this house was built in 1888, Theodore Jansen worked at American Hose Manufacturing Company as a blacksmith. In 1890 he started working for a carriage manufacturer, Young, Harford and Company. The Vernacular Queen Anne style residence is a 1½-story, front gable cottage with large wall dormers and a wing off the back. It features stickwork aprons on the main and the dormer gables. There is also a bracketed polygonal window bay on the first floor. It has been listed on the National Register of Historic Places since 1983.

References

Houses completed in 1888
Queen Anne architecture in Iowa
Houses in Davenport, Iowa
Houses on the National Register of Historic Places in Iowa
National Register of Historic Places in Davenport, Iowa